Munger may refer to:

Places
Munger - A historical city in Bihar famous for its cigarette & gun factory
Munger district, surrounding the town and forming part of the administrative Munger division
 Munger, DuPage County, Illinois, unincorporated community, United States
 Munger, Pike County, Illinois, unincorporated community, United States
 Munger, Minnesota and nearby Willard Munger State Trail, United States
 Munger, Missouri, an unincorporated community
 A community in Merritt Township, Michigan

People
Alvah R. Munger (1842–1928), American politician and farmer
Charlie Munger (born 1924), American investment manager
George Munger (disambiguation), several people
George Munger (American football) (1909–1994) football player and coach for whom the George Munger Award is named
George Munger (artist) (1771–1825), engraver known for portraits and miniatures
George Munger (soldier) (18??–), Union Army corporal who helped capture Jefferson Davis
Gilbert Munger (1837–1903), American landscape painter
Michael Munger (born 1958), American economist and libertarian candidate
Red Munger (1918–1996, born George David Munger), American baseball player
Robert S. Munger (1854–1923), American businessman, inventor and philanthropist
Rudolf Münger (1862–1929), Swiss painter
Theodore T. Munger (1830–1910), American Congregational clergyman

Other
Mrs. Munger's Class Television skit